Events from the year 1871 in Denmark.

Incumbents
 Monarch – Christian IX
 Prime minister – Ludvig Holstein-Holsteinborg

Events

 2 January – The Stöðulög, laws on the constitutional standing of Iceland within the Danish realm, are passed.
 5 October – Den Danske Landmandsbank, Hypothek- og Vexelbank i Kjøbenhavn, present-day Danske Bank, is founded.
 15 August  The Vendsyssel Railway is inaugurated with the first train to Frederikshavn.
 15 October – The Social Democratic party is founded by Louis Pio, Harald Brix and Paul Geleff.
 8 November – At Lyksborg Slot, Princess Thyra gives birth to a daughter, conceived in a love affair with a cavalry lieutenant. The girl is adopted by a couple in Odense shortly after birth.

Date unknown
 The first private kindergarten in Denmark is established in Copenhagen by writer Erna Juel-Hansen. Kindergarten with public support are not seen until 1901.
 The Danish Women's Society, the world's oldest women's rights organization, is founded.

Births
 15 February – Martin Knudsen, physicist and researcher after whom the Knudsen gas state, the Knudsen number, and the Knudsen layer are named (died 1949)
 5 April – Søren Absalon Larsen, physicist active in the field of electroacoustics; the Larsen effect was named after him (died 1957)
 13 June – Elna Munch, feminist, suffragist and politician, one of the three first women to be elected to the Danish parliament in 1918 (died 1945)
 19 July – Lars Jørgen Madsen, multiple Olympic medalist in rifle shooting (died 1925)
 29 July – August Paulsen, Danish-American businessman and philanthropist (died 1927)
 2 November – Poul Heegaard, mathematician active in the field of topology, professor in mathematics at the University of Copenhagen 1910–1917, professor in mathematics at the University of Kristiania 1917–1941 (died 1948)
 12 November – Dagmar Hansen, cabaret singer and stage performer, Denmark's first pin-up girl (died 1959)
 10 December – Jens Christian Bay, Danish-American writer and librarian (died 1962)
 14 December – Harald Moltke, nobleman, painter and author (died 1960)

Deaths
 2 January – Niels Kjærbølling, ornithological writer and lithographer, founder of Copenhagen Zoo (born 1806)
 1 March – Johan Henrik Nebelong, architect (born 1817)
 28 March – Johan Vilhelm Gertner, portrait painter (born 1818)
 5 June – Erich Christian Werlauff, historian (born 1781)
 9 October – Niels Sigfred Nebelong, historicist-style architect, resident architect for the Danish lighthouse authority (born 1806)
 15 October – Oscar O'Neill Oxholm, military officer and landowner (born 1809)
 2 December – Moritz Unna, photographer (born 1811)
 12 December – Henrik Rung, composer, conductor and vocal pedagogue (born 1807)
 27 December – Carl Ferdinand Allen, historian (born 1811)

References

 
1870s in Denmark
Denmark
Years of the 19th century in Denmark